Kentucky Route 1020 (KY 1020) is a  north–south state highway in north central Kentucky, traversing portions of Bullitt and Jefferson counties, including the Louisville metropolitan area.

Route description

KY 1020 begins near Shepherdsville at a junction with KY 61. It travels northward into Louisville Metro/Jefferson County, where it has junctions with KY 841 and Interstate 264 (I-264). KY 1020 splits in downtown Louisville; the northbound lanes are on Second Street and the southbound lanes are on Third Street. Its northern terminus in downtown Louisville is at the intersection where US 31W and US 31E merge, with US 31 straight ahead.

Major intersections

See also 

Roads in Louisville, Kentucky

References

1020
1020
1020